Star Search Croatia Season 1 was the first season of the second Croatian version of Pop Idol. It was aired in 2009.

Auditions were about to be held in the four biggest cities of the country: Zagreb, Rijeka, Osijek and Split. The competitors are judged by Croatian musicians Tony Cetinski, Jelena Radan and Goran Lisica Fox.

Antonija Blaće, famous for participating and hosting the Croatian Big Brother edition is the host of the competition which makes her the first person ever to host the two local versions of these franchises.

Bojan Jambrošić won the show on June 19, 2009 ahead of the favoured Zoran Mišić.

Live Shows

Top 17 Semifinal Idol's Choice

Original Airdate: April 17, 2009

Advancing to Top 11 (Public votes): Zoran, Matej, Barbara, Manuela, Bojan, Nikolina, Iva

Advancing to Top 11 (Jury selection):  Sementa, Anđela, Carla Jelena, Duško

Top 11 - Croatian Love Songs

Original Airdate: April 24, 2009

Bottom 5: Anđela Poljak, Duško Šarić, Manuela Svorcan, Matej Miličić, Sementa Rajhard

Eliminated: Anđela Poljak, Manuela Svorcan

Top 9 - Sexy Show

Original Airdate: May 1, 2009

Bottom 5: Carla Belovari, Duško Šarić, Iva Ušalj, Nikolina Kovačević, Sementa Rajhard

Eliminated: Sementa Rajhard

Top 8 - Dedications

Original Airdate: May 8, 2009

Bottom 2: Barbara Dautović, Duško Šarić

Eliminated: Duško Šarić

Top 7 - Film Songs / Croatian Songs

Original Airdate: May 15, 2009

Bottom 4: Bojan Jambrošić, Carla Belovari, Iva Ušalj, Matej Miličić

Eliminated: Iva Ušalj

 Vedran Misic from suisse

Finals Elimination Chart

External links
 Official website
 Unofficial fansite

2009 television seasons